Sierra View is a census-designated place located in Chestnuthill and Tunkhannock Townships in Monroe County in the state of Pennsylvania.  The community is located near Sun Valley.  As of the 2020 census the population was 4,907 residents.

Demographics
 

The hamlet had moderate population growth in the 2010s, growing 2% during the decade.

References

Census-designated places in Monroe County, Pennsylvania
Census-designated places in Pennsylvania